Henryk Gołębiewski (born 22 July 1942 in Lubowidz) is a Polish politician. He was elected to Sejm on 25 September 2005, getting 8454 votes in 2 Wałbrzych district as a candidate from the Democratic Left Alliance list.

He was also a member of Senate 2001-2005.

From 2003 to 2004, marshal of the Lower Silesian Voivodeship.

See also
Members of Polish Sejm 2005-2007

External links
Henryk Gołębiewski - parliamentary page - includes declarations of interest, voting record, and transcripts of speeches.

1942 births
Living people
Democratic Left Alliance politicians
Members of the Senate of Poland 2001–2005
Members of the Polish Sejm 2005–2007
Members of the Polish Sejm 2007–2011
People from Żuromin County
Voivodeship marshals of Poland
Lower Silesian Voivodeship